Anthony Allen Kemp (born October 31, 1991) is an American professional baseball second baseman and outfielder for the Oakland Athletics of Major League Baseball (MLB). He previously played in MLB for the Houston Astros and Chicago Cubs. Kemp won the World Series with the Astros in 2017.

Career

Amateur
Kemp graduated from Centennial High School in Franklin, Tennessee. He attended Vanderbilt University, where he played college baseball for the Vanderbilt Commodores baseball team. In 2011, Kemp was named the Southeastern Conference's (SEC) Freshman of the Year and First Team All-SEC. He was a key contributor on the first Vanderbilt baseball team to make it to the College World Series. In 2012, he played collegiate summer baseball with the Cotuit Kettleers of the Cape Cod Baseball League. He was named an All-American and the SEC Baseball Player of the Year in 2013.

Houston Astros 
The Astros selected Kemp in the fifth round of the 2013 MLB draft. In 2015, Kemp began the season with the Corpus Christi Hooks of the Class AA Texas League. He received a midseason promotion to the Fresno Grizzlies of the Class AAA Pacific Coast League, and appeared in the 2015 All-Star Futures Game.

Kemp began the 2016 season with Fresno, and was promoted to the major leagues on May 16. He was optioned to Fresno on June 25, 2016, when A. J. Reed was called up for his debut. On August 7, 2016, Kemp was recalled to the Astros. After center fielder Carlos Gómez was designated for assignment, Kemp and Jake Marisnick platooned in centerfield.

On March 19, 2017, he was optioned back to Fresno. On April 27, 2017 the Astros promoted Kemp to the major leagues to replace injured Teoscar Hernández. On May 1, 2017, the Astros optioned him back down as Marisnick was activated off of the disabled list.

On September 2, 2017, he was called up to the Astros and played in their doubleheader against the Mets, their first home game after Hurricane Harvey. In 17 games with the Astros, Kemp had a .216 average and 4 RBI. The Astros finished the season with a 101-61 record and eventually won the 2017 World Series, their first ever championship title. Kemp did not participate in any playoff action, but was still on the 40-man roster at the time, and won his first championship title. 

In March 2018, the Astros optioned Kemp back to Fresno. He was called up on May 16 to replace Jake Marisnick. In the 2018 season, Kemp played in 97 games for the Astros, batting .263/.351/.392 with 6 HR and 30 RBI, playing primarily in left field. He was mocked by the Fenway Park crowd and organist during the second game of the 2018 American League Championship Series (ALCS) when he took an extended period of time to return to the batter's box after a foul ball. Following the third game of the 2018 ALCS, Kemp received wide sports media coverage for making a leaping catch against the left field wall on a ball hit by Steve Pearce. The Red Sox challenged the catch at the wall, since it sounded like the ball hit the wall first. After further review, they announced the catch as confirmed, meaning the MLB replay crew in New York saw conclusive evidence of the catch. In game four, Kemp hit a fourth inning solo home run off Rick Porcello after only hitting six homers during the regular season.

On July 26, 2019, the Astros designated Kemp for assignment to activate Carlos Correa.

His 2019 season with the Astros ended with a disappointing .227/.308/.417 line over 163 at-bats, while setting a career high with 7 homeruns in just 66 games, prior to being traded.

Chicago Cubs
On July 31, 2019, the Astros traded Kemp to the Chicago Cubs for Martín Maldonado.

Oakland Athletics
On January 13, 2020, Kemp was traded to the Oakland Athletics for minor league first baseman Alfonso Rivas. In 2020 for the Athletics, Kemp slashed .247/.363/.301 with no home runs and four RBI in 49 games. In 2021, he slashed .279/.382/.418 with 8 home runs and 37 RBIs in 131 games.

In 2022 he batted .235/.307/.334 in 497 at bats. He had the lowest average exit velocity of all major league batters, at 84.4 mph, and the lowest percentage of hard-hit balls, at 14.9%.

On January 13, 2023, Kemp signed a one-year, $3.725 million contract with the Athletics, avoiding salary arbitration.

See also
2013 College Baseball All-America Team

References

External links

1991 births
Living people
People from Franklin, Tennessee
Baseball players from Tennessee
Baseball second basemen
Major League Baseball outfielders
Houston Astros players
Chicago Cubs players
Oakland Athletics players
Vanderbilt Commodores baseball players
Tri-City ValleyCats players
Quad Cities River Bandits players
Lancaster JetHawks players
Corpus Christi Hooks players
Fresno Grizzlies players
All-American college baseball players
African-American baseball players
Cotuit Kettleers players
Rochester Honkers players